The Onaping River is a river in Greater Sudbury and Sudbury District in Northeastern Ontario, Canada. It is in the Great Lakes Basin and is a right tributary of the Vermilion River.

Course
The creek begins at Onaping Dam on Turceotte Bay on Onaping Lake in geographic Emo Township, Sudbury District, and flows southeast then south, and takes in the left tributary Michaud River. It continues south, passes into geographic Levack Township, Greater Sudbury, takes in the right tributary Carhess Creek, flows over a long series of rapids, enters geographic Dowling Township and passes under Ontario Highway 144 at the community of Levack. The river then flows over the  High Falls, which can be viewed from a scenic lookout and nature and geologic trail accessible from the adjacent Ontario Highway 144 (the original Canadian Pacific Railway transcontinental main line — served on this portion of the track by the Via Rail Sudbury – White River train — is also tangent to the right bank of the river at this point). The falls were captured by renowned Group of Seven painter A. Y. Jackson. The scenic lookout is thus named in his honour. The falls area lies on fallback debris that resulted from the meteor impact that created the Sudbury Basin. The river then turns northeast, heads past the community of Dowling, enters the northwestern portion of geographic Balfour Township, and reaches its mouth at the Vermilion River. The Vermilion River flows via the Spanish River to Lake Huron.

Tributaries
Mosquito Creek (left)
Windy Creek (right)
Carhess Creek (right)
Wanitanga Creek (left)
Leinster Creek (right)
Shingwak Creek (left)
Michaud River (left)
Friday Creek (left)
Rhodes Creek (left)

See also
List of rivers of Ontario

References

Sources

Rivers of Sudbury District
Rivers of Greater Sudbury